Dilkusha Bagh (literally The Engaging Garden or The Charming Garden) is an old date orchard in Bhakkar District of Punjab, Pakistan. It is believed to be a Mughal garden built by Humayun or Akbar. However, Humayun never visited the area. On his retreat to Safavid Empire, he went to another Bakhar in Sindh to seek help from Mahmood Khan, but this route was rejected by Major Henry Raverty as the possible retreat of Humayun.

Dilkusha Bagh is home to hundreds of rare date cultivars, along with its common Basra dates. Efforts are being made by district government and Agriculture Department of Punjab to preserve these hundreds of rare date cultivars.

History
Very little is recorded about this orchard, the official district record states: 

One of the later works from the 18th century gives an idea about the Orchard as there were no other major orchards except Dilkusha Bagh, in this region, in the 18th century. The Imperial Gazetteer of India mentions the Orchards of Bhakkar as follows:

References

Mughal gardens in Pakistan
Geography of Punjab, Pakistan